Ranoidea spinifera is a species of frog in the subfamily Pelodryadinae. It is sometimes called spiny tree frog, but that can also refer to Nyctixalus spinosus of the Philippines. It is endemic to Papua New Guinea. Its natural habitats are subtropical or tropical moist lowland forests, subtropical or tropical moist montane forests, rivers, rural gardens, and heavily degraded former forests.

References
 

Ranoidea (genus)
Amphibians of Papua New Guinea
Amphibians described in 1968
Taxonomy articles created by Polbot
Taxobox binomials not recognized by IUCN